The 2022 Ambetter 301 was a NASCAR Cup Series race held on July 17, 2022, at New Hampshire Motor Speedway in Loudon, New Hampshire. Contested over 301 laps, on the  speedway. It was the 20th race of the 2022 NASCAR Cup Series season.

This race was the last full-time start for Kurt Busch, as Busch suffered a concussion during the qualifying for the next race and sat out the rest of the season, eventually  stepping away from full-time competition for 2023.

Report

Background

New Hampshire Motor Speedway is a  oval speedway located in Loudon, New Hampshire, which has hosted NASCAR racing annually since the early 1990s, as well as the longest-running motorcycle race in North America, the Loudon Classic. Nicknamed "The Magic Mile", the speedway is often converted into a  road course, which includes much of the oval.

The track was originally the site of Bryar Motorsports Park before being purchased and redeveloped by Bob Bahre. The track is currently one of eight major NASCAR tracks owned and operated by Speedway Motorsports.

Entry list
 (R) denotes rookie driver.
 (i) denotes driver who is ineligible for series driver points.

Practice

Practice results

Qualifying

Qualifying results
{| class="wikitable" style="font-size:95%"
|-
! Pos
! 
! Driver
! Team
! Manufacturer
! 
! 
|-
! 1
| 19 || Martin Truex Jr. || Joe Gibbs Racing || Toyota || 29.739 || 29.964
|-
! 2
| 9 || Chase Elliott || Hendrick Motorsports || Chevrolet || 29.898 || 30.009
|-
! 3
| 45 || Kurt Busch || 23XI Racing || Toyota || 29.669 || 30.032
|-
! 4
| 23 || Bubba Wallace || 23XI Racing || Toyota || 30.070 || 30.106
|-
! 5
| 20 || Christopher Bell || Joe Gibbs Racing || Toyota || 29.968 || 30.127
|-
! 6
| 24 || William Byron || Hendrick Motorsports || Chevrolet || 29.945 || 30.136
|-
! 7
| 10 || Aric Almirola || Stewart-Haas Racing || Ford || 30.135 || 30.219
|-
! 8
| 5 || Kyle Larson || Hendrick Motorsports || Chevrolet || 29.748 || 30.224
|-
! 9
| 6 || Brad Keselowski || RFK Racing || Ford || 30.276 || 30.409
|-
! 10
| 4 || Kevin Harvick || Stewart-Haas Racing || Ford || 29.945 || 0.000 
|-
! 11
| 12 || Ryan Blaney || Team Penske || Ford || 29.997 || —
|-
! 12
| 22 || Joey Logano || Team Penske || Ford || 30.056 || —
|-
! 13
| 8 || Tyler Reddick || Richard Childress Racing || Chevrolet || 30.186 || —
|-
! 14
| 11 || Denny Hamlin || Joe Gibbs Racing || Toyota || 30.187 || —
|-
! 15
| 34 || Michael McDowell || Front Row Motorsports || Ford || 30.267 || —
|-
! 16
| 17 || Chris Buescher || RFK Racing || Ford || 30.293 || —
|-
! 17
| 18 || Kyle Busch || Joe Gibbs Racing || Toyota || 30.312 || —
|-
! 18
| 1 || Ross Chastain || Trackhouse Racing Team || Chevrolet || 30.332 || —
|-
! 19
| 99 || Daniel Suárez || Trackhouse Racing Team || Chevrolet || 30.364 || —
|-
! 20
| 16 || A. J. Allmendinger (i) || Kaulig Racing || Chevrolet || 30.391 || —
|-
! 21
| 7 || Corey LaJoie || Spire Motorsports || Chevrolet || 30.410 || —
|-
! 22
| 43 || Erik Jones || Petty GMS Motorsports || Chevrolet || 30.422 || — 
|-
! 23
| 41 || Cole Custer || Stewart-Haas Racing || Ford || 30.455 || —
|-
! 24
| 47 || Ricky Stenhouse Jr. || JTG Daugherty Racing || Chevrolet || 30.461 || — 
|-
! 25
| 31 || Justin Haley || Kaulig Racing || Chevrolet || 30.476 || — 
|-
! 26
| 38 || Todd Gilliland (R) || Front Row Motorsports || Ford || 30.523 || — 
|-
! 27
| 48 || Alex Bowman || Hendrick Motorsports || Chevrolet || 30.584 || — 
|-
! 28
| 2 || Austin Cindric (R) || Team Penske || Ford || 30.601 || — 
|-
! 29
| 14 || Chase Briscoe || Stewart-Haas Racing || Ford || 30.675 || — 
|-
! 30
| 3 || Austin Dillon || Richard Childress Racing || Chevrolet || 30.759 || — 
|-
! 31
| 21 || Harrison Burton (R) || Wood Brothers Racing || Ford || 30.785 || — 
|-
! 32
| 78 || B. J. McLeod (i) || Live Fast Motorsports || Ford || 30.885 || — 
|-
! 33
| 15 || J. J. Yeley (i) || Rick Ware Racing || Ford || 31.064 || — 
|-
! 34
| 77 || Josh Bilicki (i) || Spire Motorsports || Chevrolet || 31.101 || — 
|-
! 35
| 42 || Ty Dillon || Petty GMS Motorsports || Chevrolet || 31.288 || — 
|-
! 36
| 51 || Cody Ware || Rick Ware Racing || Ford || 31.359 || — 
|-
! colspan="7"|Official qualifying results
|}

Race

Stage ResultsStage OneLaps: 70Stage TwoLaps: 115

Final Stage ResultsStage Three'Laps:'' 116

Race statistics
 Lead changes: 8 among 7 different drivers
 Cautions/Laps: 9 for 52
 Red flags: 0
 Time of race: 3 hours, 14 minutes and 45 seconds
 Average speed:

Media

Television
USA covered the race on the television side. Dale Earnhardt Jr., four-time and all-time Loudon winner Jeff Burton and Steve Letarte called the race from the broadcast booth. Kim Coon, Parker Kligerman and Marty Snider handled the pit road duties from pit lane.

Radio
PRN had the radio call for the race, which was also simulcast on Sirius XM NASCAR Radio. Doug Rice and Mark Garrow called the race from the booth when the field races down the frontstretch. Rob Albright called the race from turns 1 & 2 and Doug Turnbull called the race from turns 3 & 4. Brad Gillie, Brett McMillan and Wendy Venturini handled the duties on pit lane.

Standings after the race

Drivers' Championship standings

Manufacturers' Championship standings

Note: Only the first 16 positions are included for the driver standings.
. – Driver has clinched a position in the NASCAR Cup Series playoffs.

References

2022 Ambetter 301
2022 NASCAR Cup Series
2022 in sports in New Hampshire
July 2022 sports events in the United States